Nandyal revenue division (or Nandyal division) is an administrative division in the Nandyal district of the Indian state of Andhra Pradesh. It is one of the 3 revenue divisions in the district with 13 mandals under its administration. The division headquarters is located at Nandyal.

Administration 
The 13 mandals administered under the Nandyal revenue division area are:

See also 
List of revenue divisions in Andhra Pradesh
Atmakur revenue division
Dhone revenue division

References 

Revenue divisions in Nandyal district